Olga Martynovna Auguste (1896-1973) was a Soviet-Latvian Politician (Communist).

She served as People's Comissar of State Control in between 13 March and 29 April 1941. As such, she was the first woman government minister in Latvia.

References

1896 births
1973 deaths
20th-century Latvian women politicians
Soviet women in politics
Latvian communists
Women government ministers of Latvia